The 2015 Arema Cronus season is the 27th season in the club's football history, the 10th consecutive season in the top-flight Liga Indonesia season and the 7th season competing in the Indonesia Super League.

Review and events

Pre–2015

May 
The 2015 Indonesia Super League was officially discontinued by PSSI on May 2, 2015 due to a ban by Imam Nahrawi, Minister of Youth and Sports Affairs, against PSSI to run any football competition.

Matches

Legend

Friendlies

Indonesia Super League

Statistics

Squad 
.

|}

Clean sheets 
As of 7 April 2015.

Disciplinary record 
As of 7 April 2015.

Transfers

In

Out

Notes 
1.Arema Cronus's goals first.

References

External links 
 Arema Cronus season at ligaindonesia.co.id 
 2015 Arema Cronus season at soccerway.com

Arema Cronus F.C.
Arema FC seasons